Goldstrike is a gold mine in Eureka County in north-eastern Nevada. It is located on the Carlin Trend, a prolific gold mining district.  It is owned and operated by Barrick Gold. Since Barrick acquired Goldstrike in 1986, until 2018 it produced 44.4 million ounces of gold.

History
The first discovery of gold in the Goldstrike property was in 1962 by Atlas Minerals. Gold was first mined from the upper, well-oxidized portion of what became the Post deposit in 1975 by PanCana Minerals Ltd., in a small open-pit heap leach operation. In 1978, Western State Minerals Corporation entered into a joint venture (JV) with PanCana.  The JV delineated ore reserves for the Post deposit in 1986. Barrick acquired 100% ownership of the property in December 1986, and mining started in 1987.

Geology
The Goldstrike mine complex comprises the  Betze-Post-Screamer and Meikle-Rodeo deposits. The Goldstrike mine adjoins Newmont Mining's Carlin mine complex. Goldstrike is northwest of the Carlin mine on the Carlin Trend.

Like most Carlin type gold deposits in Nevada the gold was epithermally deposited in carbonate or silicate sedimentary rocks. The heat source was magmatic but the exact mechanism is still under debate.

Mining operations
The Goldstrike complex consists of three distinct mines: the large Betze-Post open-pit mine, and the Meikle and Rodeo underground mines. The ore from all three mines is milled, oxidized in either a roaster or an autoclave, then leached in either a carbon-in-leach (CIL) cyanidation circuit or a calcium thiosulfate circuit. The two treatment facilities treat ores from both the open pit and underground mines.  Recovered gold is processed into doré on-site and shipped to outside refineries for processing into gold bullion.

This was 24% of the total  output of all gold mining operations in Nevada for 2015. In 2018 Goldstrike produced 795,663 ounces of gold, making it the world's eighth largest gold mine.

See also
Gold mining in Nevada
List of active gold mines in Nevada

References

External links
 Barrick Gold Corporation website
 Barrick Goldstrike - mine tour 2000, photo gallery at Flickr
Barrick Goldstrike Mine mine geology, accessed 11/9/2019 
 A Guide to the Gold Strike Mine (Nevada) records, 99-63. Special Collections, University Libraries, University of Nevada, Reno.

Buildings and structures in Eureka County, Nevada
Gold mines in Nevada
Barrick Gold
1975 establishments in Nevada